Mike McQuary ("McQ") is an American entrepreneur. He has founded and led a diverse portfolio of companies.
 
McQuary is the CEO of JTEC Energy, Inc. JTEC Energy is a spin-off of Johnson R&D, an Atlanta research company founded and led by former NASA scientist and Super Soaker inventor Dr. Lonnie Johnson. JTEC Energy was formed to complete development and commercialize the Johnson Thermo-Electrochemical Converter (JTEC), a machine that converts temperature differential into electricity at very high efficiency rates. 

McQuary is the former CEO of Autonomous Fusion and Wheego Technologies, former President and COO of EarthLink & MindSpring and the former CEO of Brash Music.
He began his career with nearly a decade of work at Mobil, followed by eight years as an entrepreneur at start up ISP MindSpring Enterprises. As President of MindSpring, he took the company from a fledgling startup, through a successful IPO to a publicly held NASDAQ $1.5 billion company.

Education and early career
Michael Sean McQuary was born in Washington DC on October 26, 1959 and as a child lived in Arlington, VA; Holliston, MA; Rochester, NY, and Richmond, VA. McQuary received a Bachelor of Arts degree in Psychology from the University of Virginia in 1981. After graduation he moved to Los Angeles and did part time construction work and performed at a few open mic nights at The Comedy Store. McQuary's first full-time job was selling paper cups for Lily-Tulip Inc. in Southern California. While doing this, he attended Pepperdine University nights and weekends to get his Masters of Business Administration degree in 1985. Also in 1985 he went to work for Mobil as a sales rep in the Plastic Packaging Division of the Chemical Division, and was subsequently promoted through a progression of management jobs in sales, marketing, new product development, and operations with moves from Los Angeles, to San Francisco, to Rochester NY to Atlanta.

MindSpring and Earthlink 
In 1992 McQuary helped develop the concept behind the Internet Service Provider MindSpring with his friend Charles Brewer, who launched the company. McQuary joined the company as Executive Vice President of Sales and Marketing in 1994 when they had service only in Atlanta with 20 employees and 1000 customers. A few months later he was named president and COO of MindSpring and in that position everyone in the company (except Charles) reported to him. He also served on MindSpring's board of directors. McQuary helped lead MindSpring through 4 public offerings and established MindSpring as the second largest ISP in the world, behind AOL, and ahead of noteworthy competitors such as Microsoft, Prodigy, AT&T, and all of the Regional Bell Operating Companies (RBOCs). MindSpring acquired and integrated over 50 ISPs during this period including Netcom, Sprynet and PSINet's consumer division. MindSpring also won every award given for quality of service including the J. D. Power and Associates Award for best ISP. MindSpring was the first (and one of the few) Internet Service Providers that was profitable. In 1999 MindSpring merged with EarthLink, and McQ continued on as president and COO and served on the board of the combined company. McQuary left EarthLink in May 2002 to spend more time with his growing family and pursue his other goals. At the time of his resignation, EarthLink (NASDAQ:ELNK) was a $1.5 billion revenue company with 5 million subscribers and 5000 employees offering services that included dial up, DSL, cable and wireless access and web hosting.

Autonomous Fusion, Wheego Electric Cars and Ruff & Tuff Electric Vehicles
McQuary was the CEO of Ruff and Tuff Electric Vehicles (RTEV) from April 2007 until June 2009. Wheego Electric Cars Inc. was formed as a spin out from RTEV in June 2009 with McQuary as Founder & CEO. The company was headquartered in Atlanta, Georgia, and was focused on designing, manufacturing, and selling affordable electric vehicles. In 2011, the  Wheego LiFe car became the third all-electric highway speed street legal car for sale in the U.S. after the Tesla Roadster and Nissan Leaf. Wheego sold 400 electric cars through 20 dealers in the U.S. Foxconn became the majority investor in Wheego in March 2014. In 2016, Foxconn elected to not build Wheego's electric cars in China, and divested its interest in Wheego, so the company pivoted to the development of autonomous driving software. The company used Artificial Intelligence and Machine Learning to develop software for self-driving autonomous cars under the name Autonomous Fusion.

Ellis, McQuary & Stanley Investment Firm 
In 2003, McQuary formed Ellis, McQuary & Stanley (EMS), an affiliation with Bert Ellis and Bahnson Stanley. EMS is a private equity investment and consulting firm based in Atlanta. They also have owned several real estate properties in West Atlanta.

Other Companies

Brash Music
In February 2004, McQuary formed a music services company called Brash Music that was dedicated to breaking the adversarial paradigm of the music business through the same value based culture management that was successful at MindSpring. Originally formed as Sixthman in October 2002, McQ split off into Brash Music when his partners at Sixthman had troubles living up to this same value system. Brash Music is an independent record label with distribution through ADA (Warner Music Group). Managed by Steve Jones who has been the CEO since 2010, artists on Brash Music have included Jump Little Children, Aaron Shust, Rubyhorse, Anthony David, Brian Vander Ark, and Michael Gungor. Brash has sold over 1 million album equivalents (digital and CD), been Grammy nominated, and won a Dove Award.

UNS 
McQuary was the CEO of UNS (Usenetserver), an Internet Usenet News Service that EMS bought in July 2004, grew 300%, and sold to Highwinds in May 2006.

Madison Grill 
McQuary was the owner of the Madison Grill restaurant in Midtown Atlanta from 2001 to 2008. The Madison Grill was located on the first floor of the EarthLink Building at 1375 Peachtree St NE.

Personal 
McQuary is the son of Harry O. McQuary III (a paper cup salesman) and Mary Hackney McQuary, a self-described gypsy who counted oil painting, astrology, and gymnastics instruction among her pursuits. He has a younger sister Katherine Elizabeth (Katie).   
He married the former Sheryl Rudloff in 1993, they divorced in 2012.
He has four children: Madison (b. 1999) and triplets Mick, Tess and Molly (b. 2001).

Leadership and Community Service 
McQuary has served on the board of directors of the Atlanta Chapter of NARAS (Grammys), Novient Inc., and Inner Strength (Atlanta at-risk teen support). He served on the board of managers of the University of Virginia Alumni Association from 2000 to 2008. He serves on the Chastain Park advisory board. 

Along with John McGrath and Fred Kemp he was one of the founders and coaches of the Pittsford NY Youth Wrestling Club in the late 1980s. He was a youth soccer and basketball coach at the Ashford Dunwoody YMCA from 2005-2012. McQuary was an assistant high school wrestling coach at Marist School from 2009 to 2018. His wrestlers included Kenneth Brinson who was a three-time National (NHSCA) champion and four time All-American. McQuary was the president of the Riverwood High School Athletic Association from 2017-2020. He was also an assistant wrestling and girls soccer coach at Riverwood, where his kids attended high school.

McQuary has spoken at two Ted Conferences.

External links
 RTEV
 BusinessWeek, RTEV: From Golf Carts to Electric Cars

American businesspeople
ExxonMobil people
Living people
1959 births